Sizzy (sometimes stylized as SIZZY, formerly known as SISSY) is a Thai girl group formed by GMMTV in 2019. It is composed of four of GMMTV's female artists, namely Ployshompoo Supasap (Jan), Ramida Jiranorraphat (Jane), Apichaya Saejung (Ciize), and Sarunchana Apisamaimongkol (Aye).

History

2019 
GMMTV first teased the formation of a new girl group on 28 October 2019. Originally named as SISSY, GMMTV tapped four of its female artists to form part of its new girl group. Ramida Jiranorraphat (Jane) played lead roles in Teenage Mom: The Series, The Gifted and Love Beyond Frontier while Ployshompoo Supasap (Jan) had supporting roles for SOTUS S: The Series and Happy Birthday. On the other hand, Sarunchana Apisamaimongkol (Aye) is known for her main role in Friend Zone. Completing the group is Apichaya Saejung (Ciize) who was part of YOUniverse.

The group officially debuted on 5 November 2019 with the release of the first single, "ชักช้า(เอิงเอย)" (Loading Love), which features fellow GMMTV artist Luke Plowden.

2020–present 
Several months since the group launched its first single, GMMTV teased a new single for the group, and the first under the name SIZZY. On 5 August 2020, their second single "เปลี่ยนคะแนนเป็นแฟนได้ไหม" (Love Score) was released featuring fellow GMMTV artist Korapat Kirdpan (Nanon).

Members

Discography

Awards and nominations

References

External links 
 
 GMMTV

Thai girl groups
GMMTV artists
Musical quartets
2019 establishments in Thailand
Musical groups from Bangkok
Musical groups established in 2019